A chainlock, also known as a smiley, is an improvised weapon which consists of a length of chain or strong cloth attached to a large lock or other piece of metal. The chainlock is mainly used in areas where other hand held weapons, such as knives, are not readily available.

The chainlock is used by swinging the heavy end of the chain at the target. The chainlock is not usually considered to be a lethal weapon, but can cause much damage when used proficiently.

It is normally used in gang warfare.

References 

Blunt weapons
Improvised weapons